= Greentown, Virginia =

Unincorporated community in Virginia, United States

Coordinates: 36°41′16″N 77°46′45″W

Greentown is an unincorporated community located in Brunswick County, in the U.S. state of Virginia.
